The Greenwood School is an historic, one-room school building which is located in West Whiteland Township, Chester County, Pennsylvania.

It was listed on the National Register of Historic Places in 1983.

History and architectural features
Built in 1872, the Greenwood School is a one-and-one-half-story, stuccoed, stone structure with a gable roof.

It was used as a school until 1941, after which it was converted to a residence.

It was listed on the National Register of Historic Places in 1983.

References 

School buildings on the National Register of Historic Places in Pennsylvania
School buildings completed in 1872
Schools in Chester County, Pennsylvania
National Register of Historic Places in Chester County, Pennsylvania